Southwest Technical College (Southwest Tech) is a public technical college in Cedar City, Utah.  It serves Beaver, Garfield, Iron and Kane counties. In addition to its campus in Cedar City, Southwest Tech also operates a campus in Kanab, Utah. Southwest Tech focuses on certificate programs in Automotive, Business, Computer Science, Culinary Arts, Digital Media, Health Professions, Industrial Maintenance and Automation, Professional Truck Driving and Welding. It is accredited by the Council on Occupational Education, and is one eight regional technical colleges in Utah under the parent organization, the Utah System of Technical Colleges.

History
Southwest Tech was founded in the late 1990s.  Dana Miller was the College President in the early 2000s.  He was succeeded by current Southwest Tech President, Brennan Wood, who was appointed in 2014 following Miller's retirement. A new $19.3 million building was constructed and completed in 2016.  In the summer of 2015, Southwest Tech received a $200,000 grant from the George S. and Dolores Dore Eccles Foundation to purchase classroom and lab equipment for the new campus, especially in support of the new Health Professions and Trades Building. In fall of 2016, Southwest Applied Technology College launched the Utah Aerospace Pathway Initiative. This initiative is a partnership between Southwest Tech, the Government Office of Economic Development, Iron County School District, and MSC Aerospace.

Accreditations
Council on Occupational Education

Academics
Southwest Tech has over 20 accredited programs in fields of Automotive, Business, Computer Science, Culinary Arts, Digital Media, Health Professions, Industrial Maintenance and Automation, Professional Truck Driving and Welding.

References

External links 

Education in Iron County, Utah
Education in Kane County, Utah
Buildings and structures in Cedar City, Utah
Educational institutions accredited by the Council on Occupational Education
Utah College of Applied Technology Colleges
1990s establishments in Utah